Velma Linford (May 30, 1907 – May 25, 2002) was an American educator, author, and politician who served as the 12th Wyoming Superintendent of Public Instruction as a Democrat.

Life

Velma Isabelle Linford was born on May 30, 1907 in Afton, Wyoming to John Amasa Linford and Elizabeth Rowland Linford. She attended Star Valley High School where she graduated in 1926 and then attended the University of Wyoming where she earned a bachelor's degree in 1930 and then a master's degree in 1934. From 1933 to 1955 she taught at Laramie High School. In 1946 she wrote "Wyoming: Frontier State" a history textbook meant for junior high school. In 1949 she was elected as National Education Association director for Wyoming at its convention in Boston, Massachusetts and on July 8, 1953 she was named to the eleven member executive committee of the organization.

Politics

On June 12, 1946 she filed to run for the Democratic nomination  for Superintendent of Public Instruction and after winning the nomination was narrowly defeated by Edna B. Stolt. It was speculated that she would run for the office again in 1950, but chose not to.

On June 10, 1954 she announced that she would seek the Democratic nomination for Superintendent of Public Instruction and after winning the nomination without opposition narrowly defeated Ray E. Robertson in the general election. During her tenure she sponsored the first statewide mental survey of children in Wyoming. In 1959 she was one of sixty people in the Atlantic Congress representing 15 NATO countries that met in London and drafted the Atlantic charter for free people. On June 18, 1962 she announced that she would seek a third term, but was narrowly defeated in the general election by Cecil Shaw by 737 votes.

On May 31, 1960 she announced that she would seek the Democratic nomination for Senator, but was narrowly defeated in the primary by Raymond B. Whitaker who went on to lose to Representative Edwin Keith Thomson. In 1968 she announced that she would seek the Democratic nomination for Wyoming's at-large congressional district, but was defeated in a landslide by John S. Wold.

Later life

In 1966 she accepted a position in VISTA and oversaw the VISTA program in the Wind River Indian Reservation and recruited volunteers. She died on May 25, 2002 in Salt Lake City, Utah and was then interred in Afton Cemetery in Afton, Wyoming.

Electoral history

References

1907 births
2002 deaths
20th-century American politicians
People from Afton, Wyoming
University of Wyoming alumni
Writers from Wyoming
Wyoming Democrats